Rivula basalis is a moth of the family Erebidae first described by George Hampson in 1891. It is found in South India, Sri Lanka, Indo-China, Thailand, South China, Taiwan, Java, Bali and Borneo.

Description
The female is ochreous with a rufous-brown tint, whereas the male is paler. Basal area of the forewing is much darker. Antemedial obtusely angled. A pale, subcostally angled postmedial visible. There is a dark shading around a bipunctate discal mark. Males possess hindwings with a subtornal cleft in the distal margin. The caterpillar has a greenish cylindrical body with a fine subdorsal white line. There is a broken, irregular, broad yellow spiracular band. Inter-segmental membranes are reddish. The bright yellowish head is heart shaped and marbled with blood red. Pupation occurs in a cocoon at the leaf tip. Host plants are grasses.

Gallery

References

Moths of Asia
Moths described in 1891
Erebidae
Rivulinae